is a private non-sectarian higher education institution located in  Tokyo, Japan. It was founded by Dr. Shigeyoshi Matsumae.

It was accredited under Japan's old educational system in 1946 and under the new system in 1950. In 2008, Tokai University, Kyushu Tokai University, and Hokkaido Tokai University were consolidated and reorganized into Tokai University. Its Chinese character name is the same as Tunghai University in Taiwan.

History 
The Bosei Seminar  was founded at Musashino to realize Dr. Shigeyoshi Matsumae's concept of education to the public.

Dr. Matsumae founded the establishing entity of the university, or the Tokai University Educational System, in 1942. The university went through phases under the Japan's old educational systems, and reorganized schools accordingly roughly upon three stages for four times.

Training institutions for engineers and industrial schools 

Foundation for Telecommunications Engineering School  (14 October 1937 - 21 September 1944) operated three schools for telecommunications (21 October 1937 - 21 September 1945), which were renamed firstly to Polytechnic School (21 September 1945 - March 1947) then to Tokai Higher Telecommunications Engineering School (March 1947 - March 1965).

Old technical college 

Under the College Law of 27 March 1903
Before the end of World War II, technical colleges were governed under the College Law of 27 March 1903 , and the Foundation for National Defense Science and Technology Institute  (8 December 1942 - 15 August 1945) operated Radio Wave Technology Development Institute (1 February 1944 - 15 August 1945), Radio Science College (18 April 1944 - 15 August 1945). In 1943 Dr. Matsumae opened the Aerial Science College  (8 April 1943 - 15 August 1945), an antecedent of Tokai University in Miho, Shizuoka, Japan.

After 1945 

Under Kyūsei daigaku system - the former Education Law of 6 December 1918 
Foundation for National Defense Science and Technology Institute was renamed to Tokai Gakuen Foundation  (15 August 1945 - May 1, 1946) under Kyūsei daigaku system, and merged three educational establishments into Tokai College (15 August 1945 - 20 October 1945) which was renamed to Tokai Science College (20 October 1945 - March 1950).
 
Before the Shinsei daigaku system went into effect in 1947, the Foundation was reformed to Tokai University Foundation (1 May 1946 - 7 March 1951) under former Education Law of 6 December 1918, which operated former Tokai University (1 May 1946 - 1 April 1950) where students finished university education in three years.

Under Shinsei daigaku system - the Education Law of 31 March 1947
School systems in Japan was reformed in March 1947, when colleges and universities regulated under the former law of education were reformed to four-years-system educational institutions.

Tokai University Educational System 
The Tokai University Educational System is one of the largest general education and research institutions in Japan. Today, Tokai University holds its headquarters in Yoyogi, Tokyo, with eight campuses all over Japan at Sapporo, Takanawa and Yoyogi in Tokyo, Hiratsuka and Isehara in Kanagawa, Shizuoka, with Kumamoto and Aso in Kumamoto; 21 schools and faculties make up approximately 80 departments, majors, and programs. With its graduate school offering 21 courses, the total student enrollment for both undergraduate and graduate is approximately 30,000 including 775 international students as of 2017.

Undergraduate schools 
Overseas field training is popular among students as they can receive language training overseas, and classes are incorporated into the curriculum for Asian Studies, European and American Studies as well as Nordic Studies. Students from other Faculty can also take courses.

School of Cultural and Social Studies 
Established in April 2018.
Admission: 450
Location: Shōnan campus
Majors: Creative Writing; Asian Studies; European and American Studies; Media Studies; Nordic Studies

School of Letters 
The university holds a collection of 6,000 archaeological artifacts of Ancient Egypt and Near East based on donation in 2010 by the family of late Professor Hachishi Suzuki, and those Ancient Egyptian papyrus documents were offered for restoration and preservation workshops during 2013 to 2015 as an international civilization project by the Research Organization. Students deciphered and published the study results for the International Projects Concerning Civilization.
Admission: 930
Location: Shōnan campus
Majors: American Civilization; Asian Civilization; Creative Writing; European Civilization; English Culture and Communications; History; Japanese Literature; Media Studies; Nordic Studies; Psychological and Sociological Studies.

School of Political Science and Economics 
Offers courses to prepare for civil service examination, as well as internship program co-hosted by public offices. 
Admission: 450
Location: Shōnan campus
Majors: Economics; Business Administration; Political Science.

School of Law 
Admission: 
Location: Shōnan campus
Majors:

School of Humanities and Culture 
Admission: 
Location: Shōnan campus
Majors: Arts; Human Development; International Studies.

School of Physical Education 
Admission: 
Location: Shōnan campus
Majors: Competitive Sports; Judo and Kendo; Physical Education; Physical Recreation; Sport & Leisure Management.

School of Science 
Admission: 
Location: Shōnan campus
Majors: Chemistry; Mathematical Sciences; Mathematics; Physics.

School of Information Science and Technology 
Admission: 
Location: Shōnan campus
Majors: Applied Computer Engineering; Human and Information Science.

School of Engineering 
Admission: 
Location: Shōnan campus
Majors: Aeronautics and Astronautics; Applied Biochemistry; Applied Chemistry; Architecture and Building Engineering; Biomedical Engineering; Civil Engineering; Electrical and Electronic Engineering; Materials Science; Mechanical Engineering; Nuclear Engineering; Optical and Imaging Science and Technology; Precision Engineering; Prime Mover Engineering.

School of Tourism 
Admission: 
Location: Shōnan campus (freshmen); Yoyogi campus (sophomore and up)
Majors: 観光学科

School of Information and Telecommunication Engineering 
Admission: 
Location: Takanawa campus
Majors: Communication and Network Engineering; Embedded Technology; Information Media Technology; Management Systems Engineering.

School of Marine Science and Technology 
Admission: 
Location: Shimizu campus
Majors: Applied Biological Science; Environmental and Societal Affairs; Fisheries; Marine and Earth Science; Marine Biology; Marine Civil Engineering; Marine Mineral Resources; Marine Science; Maritime Civilizations; Navigation; Navigation and Ocean Engineering.

School of Medicine 

Admission: 
Location: Isehara campus
Majors: 医学科 看護学科※1

School of Health Sciences 
The School of Health Sciences is merged into the School of Medicine since April 2018.
Admission: 160
Location: Isehara campus
Majors: Nursing; Social Work.; 任用資格; :w:ja:スクールカウンセラー#スクールソーシャルワーカー

School of Business Studies 
Admission: 
Location: campus
Majors: Business Management.

School of Business Administration 
Admission: 
Location: Kumamoto campus
Majors: Business Administration; Tourism Management

School of Industrial Engineering 
Admission: 
Location: campus
Majors: Environment Conservation Sciences; Electronics and Intelligent Systems Engineering

School of Industrial and Welfare Engineering 
Admission: 
Location: campus
Majors: Production Engineering; Information Engineering; Architecture and Civil Engineering.

School of Agriculture 
Admission: 
Location: Aso campus※2（熊本）
Majors: he応用植物科学科／応用動物科学科／バイオサイエンス学科

School of International Cultural Relations 
Admission: 
Location: campus
Majors:

School of Biological Science and Engineering 
Admission: 
Location: campus
Majors:

School of Biological Engineering 
Admission: 
Location: campus
Majors:

Other courses 
Japanese Language Course for International Students
Shipboard Training Course
Tokai Cool Japan

Graduate schools

Master's degree programs 
Agriculture; Arts; Economics; Engineering; Health Sciences; Human Environmental Studies; Industrial Engineering; Information and Telecommunication Engineering; Law; Letters; Medicine; Physical Education; Political Science; Oceanography; Regional Development Studies; Science; Science and Engineering.

Doctoral degree programs 
Bioscience; Earth and Environmental Science; Economics; Letters; Medicine; Political Science; Science and Technology.

Professional graduate school 
Tokai Law School

Facilities

Campuses 

Yoyogi Campus with University headquarters

 Address: 2-28-4 Tomigaya, Shibuya, Tokyo
Nearest station: Yoyogi-hachiman Station on Odakyu Odawara Line, or Yoyogi-koen Station on Tokyo Metro Chiyoda Line.

Aso Campus

Address: Kawayou, Minamiaso-mura, Aso-gun, Kumamoto Prefecture
Nearest station:

Shonan Campus

Address: 4-1-1 Kitakaname, Hiratsuka City, Kanagawa Prefecture
Nearest station: 15 mininutes on foot from Tōkaidaigaku-mae Station of Odakyu Odawara Line

Isehara Campus

Address: Boseidai, Isehara City, Kanagawa Prefecture
Nearest station: Isehara Station on Odakyu Odawara Line

Kumamoto Campus

Address:9-1-1 Toroku, Kumamoto, Kumamoto Prefecture
Nearest station:

Sapporo Campus
Prefecture
Address: 1-1-1 Minamisawa 5-jō, Sapporo City, Hokkaidō
Nearest station:

Shimizu Campus

Address: 3-20-1 Shimizu-orido, Shizuoka City, Shizuoka Prefecture
Nearest station: Shimizu Station on JR Tōkaidō Line

Takanawa Campus

Address:2-3-23 Takanawa, Minato, Tokyo
Nearest station:

Overseas offices 
  Hawaii US: Tokai University Pacific Center A.K.A. Hawaii Tokai International College (HTIC)
  Denmark: Tokai University European Center
  Austria: Tokai University Vienna Office (Former The Matsumae Budocenter)
  Russia: Tokai University Russia Office (Vladivostok), In Far Eastern Federal University
  South Korea: Seoul office, In Hanyang University
 Thailand:
 Tokai University Asian Office at KMITL
 King Mongkut's Institute of Technology Ladkrabang (KMITL)

Hospitals affiliated to the School of Medicine 
Tokai University Hospital
Highly emergency medical care center
Tokai University Ōiso Hospital
Tokai University Tokyo Hospital
Tokai University Hachiōji Hospital

Others 
"Bosei-maru", the marine research vessel

Achievements

Industry-academia-government collaboration 
As Ministry of Education, Culture, Sports, Science and Technology has been encouraging joint ventures among the industry sector, academia and government functions, between 1994 and 2004, Tokai University applied 519 patents compared to Nihon University (390), Waseda University (358), Tokyo Institute of Technology (338) and 324 cases for Nagoya University. By 2004, Tokyo University as a national institute  lead 1,361 joint ventures, Waseda University lead 683 as the top private institute against 278 by Tokai University ranking at the 15th place, whereas Tokai University was commissioned 211 projects (12th) while Tokyo University attracted 818 at the top.

Le Mans 24 Hours 
A student team at Tōkai University fielded a car for the Le Mans 24 Hours race in 2008. This was the first time that a university team attempted to enter the race.

The team entered a Courage-Oreca LC70-YGK numbered 22 in the LMP1 class. It completed 185 laps (just under half that of the race winner), retiring due to a gearbox problem, and was not classified.
TOKAI UNIVERSITY Le Mans Project

It has been confirmed that they will race in the Asian Le Mans Series in November 2009. The team raced at the 2010 1000 km of Zhuhai and will race again at the 2011 6 Hours of Zhuhai, both races are part of the Intercontinental Le Mans Cup.

Global Green Challenge 
The Tokai Challenger is a solar car. The Tokai Challenger has become the winner of the 2009 World Solar Challenge, a race for solar cars across Australia. The car was designed and tested in collaboration with students from Tokai University and several Japanese companies in the automotive industry.

The Tokai Challenger covered the 3,021 kilometers off in 29 hours 49 minutes and it took an average speed of 100.54 kilometers per hour.

Scholarships
Athletes
Sport scholarship
Foreign students
Foreign student scholarship
Foreign student special scholarship
MATSUMAE Shigeyoshi Foreign student scholarship
General
Emergency scholarship (For those with family support)
General entrance examination top performer scholarship
International exchange scholarship
Labor scholarship (Service in a university)
MATSUMAE Shigeyoshi Commemoration Fund
Faculty scholarship
Self-study scholarship
Establishment commemoration paper scholarship
Graduate school students
Graduate school scholarship
Medical/Health science department students
Medical department scholarship
SATO Kanezō scholarship loan (Department of Medical & Health science Student)
BOSEI scholarship (Department student of Health science of nursing)
Private sponsors
KAWAKAMI Masuo & UCHIDA Shoyu scholarship
SATO Kanezō Research training scholarship
TOKAI University Supporters' association scholarship

Public relations

The Tokyo 12 Universities 
The university is a member of the Tokyo 12 Universities, a joint public relations body for those headquartered in Tokyo, formed in 1964. It consists of Aoyama Gakuin University, Chuo University, Hosei University, Keio University, Kokugakuin University, Meiji University, Nihon University, Rikkyo University, Senshu University, Sophia University, and Waseda University.

Collaborative administration for university facilities 
The Research and Promotion Division administers Technical Collaborative Management Office to promote aggressive research activities by the faculty and student of the university, as well as to share university facilities with private companies and regions, aiming to return resources to society.
Advanced physical property evaluation facility
chemical equipment analysis room - analysis equipment/facilities shared for inorganic, organic and biochemical systems.

Affiliated institutions

Archive, memorial halls and museums 
Bōsei Academic and Archive Center - Archive
Matsumae Commemoration Hall - on Shonan campus
Museum of the School of Marine Science and Technology, Tokai University - an aquarium and dynosaurium in one facility, Miho, Shizuoka
Shigeyoshi Matsumae Memorial Hall - on Kumamoto campus

Boarding school 
Tokai University Boarding School in Denmark (now closed)

Extension centers 
Regional Collaboration Center - programs on Shonan, Takanawa and Kumamoto campuses with off campus offerings co-hosted by the city of Sagamihara

Publishing 
Tokai University Press
Tokai Newspress - a campus newspaper with its website
Tokai Sports - weblog for students' sports activities, discontinued January 2018

Research institutes and research centers 
Creative Science and Technology Research Organization 
Civilization Laboratory 
Ocean Research Laboratory 
Integrated Medicinal Laboratory
Advanced Life Science Institute 
Educational Development Research Center 
Sports Medical Science Institute 
Agricultural Research Institute 
Okinawa Area Studies Center 
Research Institute for Science and Technology 
Information Technology Center 
Space Information Center 
Integrated Social Science Institute 
Peace Strategy International Research Institute 
Micro / Nano Research and Development Center
Life Sciences Institute at the Junior College
Integrated Nursing Research Facility at Medical Technology Junior College 
Tourism and Culture Research Institute at Fukuoka Junior College

Welfare facilities 
Ginreiso - cottage for mountaineering/ski in Jōzankei area
Tsumagoi Training Center - Sports and lecture facilities with accommodation, open to the public, Gumma prefecture
Yamanakako Seminar House - near Lake Yamanaka
Miho Training Center - a hotel with lecture rooms, open to the public
Matsumae Hall - on Shonan campus
International Friendship Hall - in the vicinity of Shonan campus, Hadano
International House - on Sapporo campus
International Hall - students' hall for international students on Shonan campus

Notable alumni

Mashu Baker - Japanese judoka
Nana Eikura - actress, model
Ryunosuke Haga - Japanese judoka
Tatsunori Hara - manager of the Yomiuri Giants
Eikō Harada - president of McDonald's Japan
Kosei Inoue - Japanese judoka
Toru Kamikawa - international football referee
Radomir Kovačević - Serbian-Yugoslav judoka, coach, and bronze medalist at the 1980 Summer Olympics
Yuya Kubo - pitcher for the Yomiuri Giants
Michael Leitch - Rugby Union Player 
Kazuo Sawa - video game music composer and musician
Riki Nakaya - Japanese judoka
Takuya Nakayama - basketball player
Satoko Okudera - screenwriter
Shohei Ono - Japanese judoka
Akinori Otsuka - pitcher for the Texas Rangers
Kenji Sakaguchi - actor
Kunihiro Shimizu - Japan national volleyball player
Kenjiro Shinozuka - rally driver
Shingo Suetsugu
Naohisa Takato - Japanese judoka
Kazuaki Tasaka - Japanese football player
Maki Tsukada
Naoki Eiga - Japanese kendoka
Toshihide Wakamatsu - actor
Yasuhiro Yamashita - undefeated Japanese judoka
Taishi Onodera - Japanese volleyball player

Notes

References

External links

 
Private universities and colleges in Japan
24 Hours of Le Mans teams
Universities and colleges in Kanagawa Prefecture
Japanese junior colleges
American football in Japan
1942 establishments in Japan
Educational institutions established in 1942
Universities and colleges in Tokyo